Victor Servranckx (26 June 1897 – 11 December 1965) was a Belgian abstract painter and designer.

He was born in Diegem (Machelen) and studied from 1913 to 1917 at the Académie Royale des Beaux-Arts in Brussels. There, in 1916, he met René Magritte, with whom he wrote "Pure Art: A Defence of the Aesthetic" in 1922. His style was influenced by cubism, constructivism, and surrealism. He died in Vilvoorde.

Notes

References
Meuris, Jacques (1991). René Magritte. Cologne: Benedikt Taschen. .

1897 births
1965 deaths
20th-century Belgian painters
Abstract painters
Belgian artists
People from Machelen
Académie Royale des Beaux-Arts alumni